When In Manila is an online metro guide book focused on Manila and the Philippines. It was created by Vince Golangco on September 1, 2009. It publishes news, reviews, and information on food, culture, music, fashion, travel, and other lifestyle topics.

When In Manila is privately owned. It has garnered a number of awards since its launch.

History
When In Manila (the preposition is deliberately capitalized "to convey its mission as a metro guide highlighting the latest lifestyle trends and developments") creator Vince Golangco, after studying and working in the US, traveled the world and settled in the Philippines because he fell in love with the country.
He originally launched When In Manila as a video blog, with a staff of four: a writer (Golangco), two videographers, and a webmaster. The group soon realized that they were spending the majority of their time handling video production, yet their videos were not getting as many views as their articles. They began focusing on the written content instead. Then one day I was at a restaurant I wanted to feature and didn’t have my crew with me, so I just took a bad video with my camera, that video ended up getting more views than the professional videos we did," Golangco observed.

On July 5, 2013, When In Manila took home Best Photo Blog/Microblog at the Tatt Awards, and as a result, the #wheninmanila hashtag trended on Twitter Philippines well into the next morning as a result of netizens tweeting and retweeting the news. This was later revealed to have been planned by their digital media consultant.

As of August 2013, it was reported that When In Manila has over 350,000 visitors per month, and has more than 1 million social media followers. According to the Philippine Daily Inquirer, Alexa.com ranks When In Manila as the 3rd most popular metro guide in the Philippines.

Content
The content of articles published by When In Manila is grouped into the following sections: news & features, food & restaurants, nightlife & events, travel & adventure, lifestyle & places, and fashion & beauty. The editorial tone is "positive" . "
When In Manila is written in an informal tone.

Awards

See also
 List of websites about food and drink

References

External links
 

Websites about food and drink
Philippine news websites
Culture in Metro Manila
Companies based in Manila
Publishing companies established in 2009
Internet properties established in 2009
Philippine companies established in 2009